Mumaith Khan (born 1 September 1985) is an Indian actress and model. She has appeared in numerous item numbers in Telugu, Hindi, Tamil,  Kannada, Bengali and Odia language films.

Early life
Khan was born on 1 September 1985. She was born and brought up in Mumbai. Her father is from Pakistan and her mother is from Tiruchirappalli.

Career
Khan has acted primarily in Telugu, Hindi, Tamil and Kannada language films. Besides movies, she has contested in the reality shows like Jhalak Dikhla Jaa 6 and first season of Bigg Boss Telugu. As of 2017 she had worked in 40 Telugu movies, over 20 Hindi movies, 16 Tamil and 5 Kannada films. Her call to fame was her cameo performance in the Sanjay Dutt starrer hit Munna Bhai MBBS. Her career was rocked by a controversy of drug allegations in which many south movie stars were also questioned. Her relationship with a prime suspect Calvin Mascerehas was also at the centre of investigation. Because of those allegations, in July 2018, Mumaith was evicted mid way from Big Boss Telugu season 1 for questioning by the special investigation team in relation to a drug racket along with 20 other prominent celebrities from South film industry. During the investigation she volunteered to giver her hair, fluid and nail samples which the SIT refused. Later she returned to the reality show after the interrogation.

In December 2016, Mumaith fell down from the bed at her apartment and hit her head which led to an internal injury damaging her nerves in the brain. She was in coma for 15 days and the doctors said it would take her two years to recover after treatment and surgery. Subsequently, this led to few neurological health problems like seizures and has been on medication for last two years. This also led to her gaining weight as her doctor advised her to keep away from the gym. Since then she has been trying to get back in shape gradually and is optimistic of making a comeback. 

Khan made her comeback with Telugu horror film Heza.

TV appearances

Filmography

Telugu 
  Swamy (2004 film)  (Cameo)
 143 - 2004 (Cameo)
 Chatrapati (2005) (Cameo)
 Pokiri (2006) (Cameo)
 Samanyudu (2006)
 Bhagyalakshmi Bumper Draw (2006) (Cameo)
 Yogi (2007) (Cameo)
 Bhookailas (2007)
 Evadaithe Nakenti (2007) as Inspector F. Maisamma
 Aadavari Matalaku Ardhalu Verule (2007) (Cameo)
 Sri Mahalakshmi (2007) (Cameo)
 Operation Duryodhana (2007) as Ruchi
 Bhajantrilu (2007) (Cameo)
 Seema Sastri (2007) (Cameo)
 Maisamma IPS (2007) as IPS Mysamma
 Vishakha Express (2008)
 Veedu Maamoolodu Kaadu (2008) (Cameo)
 Mangatayaru Tiffin Centre (2008) as Dolly / Mangatayaru
 Lakshmi Putrudu (2008)
 Aatadista (2008)
 Manchu Kurise Velalo (2008) (Cameo)
 Sawaal (2008) (Cameo)
 Bujjigadu (2008) (Cameo)
 Neninthe (2008) as Mumaith Khan (herself)
 Dhee Ante Dhee (2009) (Cameo)
 Punnami Naagu (2009) as The Female Snake
 Target (2009) as Nandini
 Magadheera (2009) (Cameo)
 Saarai Veerraju (2009)
 L Board (2010)
 Prathi Kshanam (2010) (Post-production)
 Gaali Seenu (2010) (Cameo) (Ready For Release: 28 September 2010)
 Nenu Naa Rakshasi (2011)
 Poison (2011)
 Dheera (2011)
 Gundello Godari (2012)
 Saradaga Ammayitho (2013)
 Kevvu Keka (2013)
 Gaddam Gang (Cameo) (2015)
 Dictator (Cameo) (2016)
 Thikka (2016)
 Heza (2019)

Hindi 
 Yeh Kya Ho Raha Hai? (2002) (Cameo)
 Kaante (2002) (Cameo) (Uncredited)
 Stumped (2003) (Cameo)
 Munna Bhai M.B.B.S. (2003) as Reena (Hospital dancer) (Cameo)
 Julie (2004) (Cameo)
 Asambhav (2004) (Cameo)
 Hulchul (2004) (Cameo)
 Dhadkanein (2005)
 Lucky: No Time for Love (2005) as Sunaina
 Nishaan (2005)
 Chocolate (2005) (Cameo)
 Dil Jo Bhi Kahey... (2005) (Cameo)
 Ek Khiladi Ek Haseena (2005) (Cameo)
 Fight Club – Members Only (2006) (Cameo)
 Rafta Rafta – The Speed (2006) (Cameo)
 Jaadu Sa Chal Gayaa (2006) (Cameo)
 Big Brother (2007) (Cameo)
 Journey Mumbai to Goa (2007)
 Fun Aur Masti (2007)
 Mere Dost Picture Abhi Baki Hai (2012)
 Rowdy Rathore (2012)
 Shortcut Romeo (2013)
 Enemmy (2013)

Tamil 
 Majunu (2001) (Hari Gore song)
Boys (2003) (Dating song)
Jai (2004) (Cameo)
 Ponniyin Selvan (2005) (Cameo)
 Thalai Nagaram (2006) (Cameo)
 Vettaiyaadu Vilaiyaadu (2006) (Cameo)
 Pokkiri (2007) (Cameo)
 Lee (2007) (Cameo)
 Madurai Veeran (2007) (Cameo)
 Parattai Engira Azhagu Sundaram (2007) (Cameo)
 Marudhamalai (2007) (Cameo)
 Villu (2009) (Cameo)
 Brahmadeva (2009) (Cameo)
 Kanthaswamy (2009) as Meenakumari (Cameo)
 Kattradhu Kalavu (2010) (Cameo)
 Siruthai as (2011) (Cameo)
 Mambattiyan as Sornam (2011)
 Arya Surya (2013) (Cameo)

Kannada 
 Orata (2007) (Cameo)
 Citizen (2008) (Cameo)
 Raaj The Showman (2009)
 Shourya (2010)
 Rajadhani (2011) (Cameo)
 Swayam Krushi (2011) (Cameo)

Bengali 
 Jole Jongole (2018) (Cameo)

Odia 
 Love Dot Com (2012) (Cameo)

Controversy 
She was being investigated in a massive drug racket. She appeared before the special investigation team of Telangana Prohibition and Excise Department in Hyderabad which is probing the case. Many other actors were involved in it. After Investigation about this case by Special Investigation Team Mumaith Khan was given clean chit.

References

External links 

 
 

1985 births
Living people
Indian film actresses
21st-century Indian actresses
Actresses in Telugu cinema
Actresses in Hindi cinema
Actresses in Tamil cinema
Actresses in Kannada cinema
Actresses in Bengali cinema
Actresses in Odia cinema
Actresses from Mumbai
Indian people of Pakistani descent
Bigg Boss (Telugu TV series) contestants